The 2024 Women's Baseball World Cup will be the 9th Women's Baseball World Cup, an international baseball tournament taking place in Thunder Bay, Canada, and one other to be determined location. The group stage will take place from the 8-13 August as two separate tournaments in two separate locations. The finals will take place in Thunder Bay, Canada in 2024. This is the first Women's Baseball World Cup event to be held in two stages. It will be the third time Canada have hosted the tournament. It is also the first time more than one nation has hosted the tournament. Japan are the defending champions.

Qualified teams

Group stage

Group A

Group B

Finals

Third place play-off

Final

Symbols

Match balls
The match balls to be used for the 2024 tournament are to be provided by SSK Corporation, which were also used in the Tokyo 2022 Olympics.

Notes

References

Women's Baseball World Cup
2020s in women's baseball
2023 in baseball
2024 in baseball
Baseball in Canada
International baseball competitions hosted by Canada
Women's sports in Canada